Sylvester Li Jian-tang (23 December 1925 – 13 August 2017) was a Catholic archbishop.

Li Jian-tang was ordained to the priesthood in 1956. He served as archbishop of the Roman Catholic Archdiocese of Taiyuan, China, from 1994 until 2013.

Notes

1925 births
2017 deaths
21st-century Roman Catholic bishops in China
20th-century Roman Catholic bishops in China
People from Taiyuan